This is a list of the archers who participated for their country at the 2016 Summer Olympics in Rio de Janeiro, Brazil from  August 5–21, 2016. 128 archers in the Olympic standard recurve discipline were set to participate at the Games.

Male archers 
Entry list at 1 August 2016

Female archers 
Entry list at 1 August 2016

External links
https://worldarchery.org/competition/14870/rio-2016-olympic-games
https://www.olympic.org/athletes
http://www.ianseo.net
http://www.yosstory.com/2016/07/panahan-olimpiade-2016-rio-de-janeiro.html

References

Lists of archers
Archery at the 2016 Summer Olympics
Archers